Death and Devil is the first novel by Frank Schätzing, but was published only after his second novel Mordshunger. The background is set in the period of 10 to 14 September 1260 in Cologne, and focuses on the struggle for power between the Colognian noblemen and the Archbishop of Cologne.

1995 novels
German historical novels
Fiction set in the 13th century